This article details the events as they occurred on Bloody Sunday (1972).

March organisers' intentions and response of the authorities 

The organisers' original intention was that the march would form up on the Creggan Estate behind a coal delivery lorry carrying the main speakers and bearing a Northern Ireland Civil Rights Association (NICRA) banner. The march would then make its way down to William Street on the edge of the Bogside, and on to the Guildhall in the city centre, where a rally would be held.

In response, the head of the Royal Ulster Constabulary (RUC) in Derry, Chief Superintendent Frank Lagan, suggested that no action should be taken against the marchers, save photographing the organisers with a view to prosecuting them later. His views were passed on to RUC Chief Constable Graham Shillington, and to Brigadier Patrick MacLellan, commander of the 8th Infantry Brigade (8 Brigade), who in turn passed them on to Major General Robert Ford, Commander of Land Forces in Northern Ireland. The final decision was taken by a "higher authority", after consultation with Ford and Shillington, to the effect that the march would be allowed to go ahead, but should be "(contained) within the general area of the Bogside and the Creggan Estate so as to prevent rioting in the City centre and damage to commercial premises and shops."

MacLellan's tactical plan saw this containment being achieved by 26 sequentially numbered barriers cutting off all streets leading from the march route to the Guildhall. These would be erected in the early afternoon, before the march began, and consist of, "wooden 'knife rests' reinforced with barbed wire and concrete slabs," backed by an army armoured personnel carrier (APC) on either side of the road. Each barrier would be manned by locally garrisoned troops of 8 Brigade and RUC officers. British Army reinforcements were:
 1st Battalion, Parachute Regiment (1 Para)
 1st Battalion, King's Own Royal Border Regiment (1 KORB)
 2nd Company, 3rd Battalion, Royal Regiment of Fusiliers (3 RRF)
 Two water cannons

Although the plan envisaged no action being taken if the march stayed within the prescribed areas, if there was any attempt to breach the barriers or to attack the security services, the latter could respond with baton rounds ("rubber bullets"), water cannon, and – as a "last resort"  when in danger of being overrun – CS gas. It was further stated:

The scoop-up operation was only to be launched on MacLellan's orders, when "the rioters and the marchers were clearly separated".
1 Para would also, "act as the second Brigade mobile reserve".

Events of the march and shootings 

The march formed up on the Creggan in "carnival mood", on the sunny afternoon of 30 January. Led by the coal lorry, it made its way down to the Bogside, its numbers swelling as more people joined en route. Moving down William Street, when the lorry reached the junction with Little James Street and Rossville Street, it swung right (south) down the latter, and headed towards Free Derry Corner. Despite the efforts of stewards to guide the marchers to follow the lorry, a large number carried on along William Street towards Barrier 14, just past the junction with Chamberlain Street. At least one man attempted to pull aside one of the knife rests, but was restrained by a steward as the crowd jeered the soldiers and RUC. Eventually the crowd in front of the barrier began to thin, and youths started to stone the troops, who responded with baton rounds. When the youths used sheets of corrugated iron as shields, the water cannon was brought up to drench them – and at least one television camera crew – with purple-dyed water. A canister of CS gas thrown from the crowd exploded in front of the water cannon, obstructing the vision of its crew, who were not wearing gas masks, so it had to be withdrawn until the gas dispersed.

After an earlier reconnaissance of the march route to determine the various points where 1 Para might launch their arrest operation, depending on which barrier was threatened, it had been thought that in the case of Barrier 14 it could be done over a wall on one side of William Street, just to the east of Little James Street, on the other side of which was the Presbyterian Church. This would have allowed the paratroopers to out-flank the rioters in a pincer movement, with other troops coming directly through Barrier 14 itself. In full daylight it was discovered that the top of the wall was covered in barbed wire, so a party of paratroopers was sent forward to cut it, while others covered them from various floors of some adjacent derelict buildings. Shortly before 16:00, these paratroopers were spotted by youths in William Street, who began to pelt them with stones and bottles. Later testifying before Widgery that nail bombs had been thrown, the paratroopers opened fire, injuring 15-year-old Damien Donaghy, who had been throwing stones, and 59-year-old John Johnston, a passerby not involved with either the march or the stone-throwing. Johnston – who was hit twice – died 4½ months later from his injuries. Shortly afterwards, a single high-velocity (i.e. rifle) shot narrowly missed the wire-cutting party, striking a drainpipe on the Presbyterian Church.

At 15:55 Colonel Derek Wilford, commanding 1 Para, requested permission to "deploy sub-unit through barricade 14 to pick up yobbos in William Street/Little James Street." MacLellan's reply was received at 16:09 and read:

Orders given to 1 Para at 1607 hours for one sub-unit of 1 Para to do scoop-up op through barrier 14.  Not to conduct running battle down Rossville Street.

By this stage, although some rioters remained at Barrier 14, most had drifted away, while Rossville Street and the waste ground to the north of the Rossville Flats was still filled with scattered stragglers from the march, as well as curious onlookers. At 16:10, while C Company of 1 Para moved through Barrier 14 on foot along William Street, a convoy of ten army vehicles carrying the battalion's Support Company (reinforced with a Composite Platoon – a.k.a. "Guinness Force" – from Administrative Company) moved through Barrier 12 and down Little James Street. This was led by two APCs carrying the 18-man Mortar Platoon, commanded by "Lieutenant N"; the Company's Command APC, supported by a Ferret armoured car; two empty APCs of Machine Gun Platoon (which had been deployed elsewhere and did not otherwise take part); two soft-skinned 4-ton lorries carrying the 36-man Composite Platoon, commanded by "Captain SA8" (a.k.a. "Captain 200"); and finally two APCs carrying the 17-man Anti-Tank Platoon, commanded by "Lieutenant 119".

Lieutenant N's APC halted on the waste ground near Eden Place, while the second Mortar Platoon APC passed the first and stopped in the courtyard of the Rossville Flats. The vehicles having come much further into the Bogside than was usual or expected caused some panic amongst the crowd. Many civilians fled down Rossville Street towards Free Derry Corner, whilst others were caught in the courtyard of the Rossville flats. Lieutenant N himself moved north towards Chamberlain Street, where he fired three warning shots to disperse a "hostile crowd". The rest of Mortar Platoon began to make arrests, but according to Widgery they came under fire, and in the next ten minutes fired 42 rounds of live 7.62 mm ammunition, leaving 17-year-old John Duddy dead in the courtyard, having been shot in the back by a bullet Widgery suggested had been fired by "Soldier V" and "intended for someone else."

The remaining army vehicles stopped in Rossville Street, although the Command APC – with the Ferret – was moved to the north end of Rossville Flats Block 1 when it came under fire. Some men from Anti-Tank Platoon moved east to Kells Walk, so Captain SA8 deployed half of his men to support them, and the rest to support Mortar Platoon. At Kells Walk, the paratroopers found themselves facing a number of people standing defiantly on the rubble barricade some 100 metres away, while others around them either sought cover or fled. Testifying to Widgery that they identified gunmen or nail bombers on the barricade, the paratroopers opened fire. By the time a ceasefire order was given, seven men had been shot dead or fatally wounded.

John Young (17), Michael McDaid (20), and William Nash (19) fell almost simultaneously. Widgery decided that Nash may have been shot by "Soldier P", but that Young and McDaid could have been shot by any of the paratroopers at Kells Walk. Michael Kelly (17) was also shot dead, the recovered bullet showing it had been fired by "Soldier F". Hugh Gilmore (17) was hit as he ran towards the barricade, but managed to stumble over it and carry on a little further before he collapsed and died. Widgery again could not identify who had fired the shot, beyond it being one of the paratroopers at Kells Walk. Two men were shot from behind as they attempted to crawl away: Kevin McElhinney (17) died on the pavement between the barricade and Rossville Flats Block 1, probably shot by "Sergeant K", while Patrick Doherty (31) died between Block 2 and Joseph Place, possibly having crawled there after being hit. Widgery decided that the evidence of "Soldier F" suggested that he had shot Doherty.

Amongst those wounded at the rubble barricade was William Nash's father, Alexander, who was hit as he went to his son's aid. Widgery decided that the medical evidence suggested that the father had been shot with a low-velocity shot from a gunman, rather than a high-velocity one from a paratrooper. Widgery's deduction from the medical evidence was that the wound was most probably "inflicted by a civilian firing haphazardly in the general direction of the soldiers without exposing himself enough to take proper aim".

At this point a large group of civilians sheltering behind the gable end of the Glanfada Park flats by the rubble barricade moved en masse through the south-east gap between the blocks of Glenfada Park North and into its central courtyard, heading for the south-west entrance leading to Abbey Park. Two of the paratroops – Soldiers "D" and "F" – at Kells Walk made their way into the courtyard via the north-east gap, closely followed by two more – "G" and "H". A number of civilians were shot, either in the courtyard or between it and Abbey Park, four of them fatally: James Wray (22), Gerald McKinney (35), Gerald Donaghy (17), and William McKinney (26). The bullet recovered from Donaghy – who did not die immediately – was traced to the rifle of "Soldier G". Wray was hit twice, the second time from close range while he was lying face down on the ground. The bullet which killed William McKinney may also have injured Joe Mahon, who survived. Widgery said the firing in Glenfada Park, "bordered on the reckless."

Across at the Rossville Flats, a group of civilians sheltering in the gap between Blocks 1 and 2 heard an injured man calling out for help, and 41-year-old Bernard McGuigan determined to go to his aid, despite the pleas of the others to remain under cover. Moving into the open and holding up a white handkerchief, McGuigan was almost immediately fatally shot in the head, possibly by "Soldier F", who was still in Glenfada Park, and testified to having fired in the direction of where McGuigan died.

Aftermath

The wounded Gerald Donaghy had been taken from Glenfada Park into a nearby house, where he was treated by a civilian doctor, while others present searched him for any identification, before being driven by car to hospital. En route the car was stopped at an army checkpoint, the driver and other civilian passenger arrested and taken away. The car was driven to an army first aid post, where Donaghy was examined by a Royal Army Medical Corps doctor and pronounced dead. Some time later, an RUC officer reported that four bulky nail bombs had been found in the pockets of Donaghy's denim jacket and jeans. Although acknowledging the suggestion that the bombs had been planted on Donaghy's body, Widgery decided that although he had been searched or examined by at least four people, "I think that on a balance of probabilities the bombs were in Donaghy's pockets throughout."

References

1972 in British politics
1972 in Northern Ireland
Massacres committed by the United Kingdom
Massacres in Northern Ireland
The Troubles in Derry (city)
The Troubles (Northern Ireland)